The Sattelhorn is a mountain of the Bernese Alps, overlooking the Lötschenlücke in the canton of Valais. It lies west of the Aletschhorn, between the Lang Glacier and the Oberaletsch Glacier.

References

External links
 Sattelhorn on Hikr

Mountains of the Alps
Alpine three-thousanders
Mountains of Switzerland
Mountains of Valais
Bernese Alps